The Great Valley Group is a proposed and widely-accepted renaming of the Great Valley Sequence, a geologic group in California. It preserves fossils dating back to the Jurassic period.

See also

 List of fossiliferous stratigraphic units in California
 Paleontology in California

References

 

Jurassic System of North America
Geologic groups of California